Dianthidium curvatum is a species of bee in the family Megachilidae. It is found in North America.

Subspecies
These three subspecies belong to the species Dianthidium curvatum:
 Dianthidium curvatum curvatum (Smith, 1854)
 Dianthidium curvatum sayi Cockerell, 1907
 Dianthidium curvatum xerophilum Cockerell, 1907

References

Further reading

External links

 

Megachilidae
Articles created by Qbugbot
Insects described in 1854